Sunčane Skale 2011 was the seventeenth edition of Sunčane Skale, an annual pop festival held in Montenegro.

Results

Nove zvijezde

Pjesma ljeta

Scoreboard

References

Sunčane Skale
2011 in Montenegro